Broken Stones is a song by British singer-songwriter Paul Weller that was released in 1995 as the fourth single from his third solo album Stanley Road. It reached no. 20 on the UK charts in the Autumn of 1995.

Weller was inspired to write the track after a conversation he had with his son at the beach, with the idea that people were like broken stones trying to become whole again.

It is the only song on Stanley Road to not contain guitar, as it is based around an electric piano.

Charts

References

1995 songs
1995 singles
Songs written by Paul Weller